Budapest Stars is a Hungarian ice hockey team that currently plays in the OB I bajnokság and in the MOL Liga. They play their home games at Budapest Icecenter, located in Budapest.

External links
 Official Club Website

Ice hockey teams in Hungary
Sport in Budapest
Erste Liga (ice hockey) teams
Ice hockey clubs established in 2001
2001 establishments in Hungary